Yves Bégou is a French former rugby league player, who played as a hooker, later, coach.

Biography 
He played for Toulouse. He also represented France, playing in the 1968 Rugby League World Cup, including the final lost against Australia. Outside the game, he worked as a linotype operator.
He also coached France in the 1977 Rugby League World Cup.

Honours

As player
 Rugby league :
 World Cup :
 Runner-up in 1968 (France).
 French Championship :
 Runner-up in 1965 (Toulouse).
 Lord Derby Cup :
 Runner-up in 1968 (Toulouse).

As coach
 Rugby league :
Champion of the Rugby League European Championship: 1977 (France)

Caps

International cap details

References

External links 

1938 births
Living people
France national rugby league team coaches
France national rugby league team players
French rugby league players
Racing Club Albi XIII players
Toulouse Olympique players
Villefranche XIII Aveyron coaches
Villefranche XIII Aveyron players
French rugby league coaches